Apalochlamys is a genus of flowering plants in the family Asteraceae. The sole species in the genus is Apalochlamys spectabilis, commonly known as showy cassinia or fireweed.

References

Monotypic Asteraceae genera
Flora of New South Wales
Flora of South Australia
Flora of Tasmania
Flora of Victoria (Australia)
Taxa named by Jacques Labillardière